Sonoma County wine is wine made in Sonoma County, California, in the United States.

County names in the United States automatically qualify as legal appellations of origin for wine produced from grapes grown in that county and do not require registration with the United States Department of the Treasury, Alcohol and Tobacco Tax and Trade Bureau.

Sonoma County is one of California's largest producers of wine grapes, far outproducing the Napa Valley AVA.

History 

Grapes were planted in Sonoma County at Fort Ross as early as 1812. Padre Jose Altimira planted several thousand grape vines at Mission San Francisco Solano in what is now the city of Sonoma, in southern Sonoma County. Cuttings from the Sonoma mission vineyards were carried throughout the northern California area to start new vineyards. By the time of the Bear Flag Revolt in Sonoma and the subsequent annexation of California by the United States in 1854, wine grapes were an established part of agriculture in the region. The vineyards of General Mariano Vallejo, military Governor of Mexican California and based in Sonoma, were producing an annual income of $20,000 at that time. The grape varietals planted would not be considered premium varietals today.

In 1855, a Hungarian named Agoston Haraszthy arrived in Sonoma Valley. Upon his arrival, he  purchased the Salvador Vallejo vineyard, which he then renamed it Buena Vista. Commissioned in 1861 by the California legislature to study viticulture in Europe, he returned with more than 100,000 cuttings of premium grape varietals. Many of the immigrants to the area were Northern Italian or from other wine-growing regions of Europe. After the Civil War and before Prohibition, wineries such as Bundschu, Foppiano, Korbel, Simi, Gundlach, Quitzow and Sebastiani were established that still exist.

During the Prohibition period, however, commercial winemaking declined. At the repeal of Prohibition in 1933, fewer than 50 wineries in Sonoma County survived. Even as late as the 1960s, only  were vineyards. Of the 250 wineries existing in 2007, over half are less than 20 years old.

During the 2019 Kincade Fire, some wineries and vineyards experienced a week of intense heat, smoke and evacuation-caused neglect of newly fermenting wine.

Winemaking 

In 2004, growers harvested 165,783 tons (150,396 tonnes) of wine grapes worth US$310 million. In 2006 the Sonoma County grape harvest amounted to 216,000 tons, worth $430 million. About 73% of Sonoma County's agricultural production is growing wine grapes— of vineyards, with over 1100 growers. The most common varieties planted are Chardonnay, Cabernet Sauvignon, and Pinot noir, though the area is also known for its Merlot and Zinfandel.

Appellations 

Sonoma County's large number (18) of American Viticulture Areas (AVAs) reflect the wide variety of climate and soil conditions in the County, the large production in the County, and the prominence of Sonoma County in the wine market. The difference in climate and soil (terroir), means that cooler climate grapes grow well in certain regions and in others warm climate grapes are more suitable. The large production of the County means that each AVA is significant in its own right. 

The prominence of the California wine industry and Sonoma County in particular has established worldwide recognition of their wine regions. At the same time, many consumers have been confused by the many different AVAs within Sonoma County. The growers voted in 2006 to form a Sonoma County Winegrape Commission, representing more than 1,800 growers. The Commission seeks to raise recognition for Sonoma County and encourages all wine from the county to bear the mark "Sonoma County" on it.

The following are appellations in Sonoma County:

Alexander Valley 

The Alexander Valley AVA is one of the most densely planted of all of Sonoma County's AVAs. Located along the Russian River, the boundary of this appellation extends north of Healdsburg up to Mendocino County north of Cloverdale. Viticulture has existed in the area since the 1850s but the wine industry has only fairly recently experienced success beginning in the 1960s with Simi Winery. Significant purchases of vineyard land by E & J Gallo Winery in 1988 and Kendall-Jackson in 1996 also raised the profile of the Alexander Valley. The profile of Alexander Valley wines has historically centered around the approachability and richness of the wines with Cabernet Sauvignon being noted for characteristic chocolate notes and warm mouthfeel. After Cabernet, Chardonnay is one of the leading varietal plantings followed by Sauvignon blanc and Zinfandel.

Bennett Valley 
The Bennett Valley AVA is one of Sonoma County's newest AVAs and is a principal grape supplier to Kendall-Jackson. The AVA is surrounded to the south, east and west by the Sonoma Mountains and to the north by the city of Santa Rosa. The region receives a moderating effect on its climate from Pacific Ocean through the cool coastal fogs and breeze that creep into the area from the southwest through Crane Canyon between Sonoma Mountain and Taylor Mountain.

Chalk Hill 
The Chalk Hill AVA is a sub-appellation of the Russian River Valley located near the town of Windsor along the foothills at the southern end of Alexander Valley and along the Santa Rosa plain. The name Chalk Hill comes from the unique volcanic soil of chalky white ash which has shown itself to perform well with planting of white wine varietals like Chardonnay and Sauvignon blanc. The majority of the region's wineries are located on the western slopes of the Mayacamas Mountains.

Dry Creek Valley 

The appellation is known particularly for its Sauvignon blanc and Zinfandel production. Dry Creek Valley AVA is home to the majority of the Sonoma Gallo vineyards, who established winery facilities in the valley in the early 1990s.

Fort Ross-Seaview 
The 27,500-acre Fort Ross-Seaview AVA is located in the western part of Sonoma County and contains 18 commercial vineyards on 506 acres. It lies entirely within the Sonoma Coast AVA and does not overlap other AVAs. Vineyards within this area are generally located on rounded ridges with summits extending above 1,200 feet consisting of steep, mountainous terrain made up of canyons, narrow valleys, ridges, and 800- to 1,800-foot peaks. Areas above 900 feet in elevation, the climate is influenced by longer periods of sunlight and is warmer than that in the surrounding land below.

Fountaingrove District 
Established in 2015, the Fountaingrove District AVA encompasses 38,000 acres in the eastern boundaries of Sonoma County. It is home to over 600 acres of hillside vineyards with elevations reaching up to 2,000 feet. The region is best known for its Cabernet Sauvignon, Merlot and Syrah varietals.

Green Valley of Russian River Valley 
The Green Valley of Russian River Valley AVA was formerly known as the Sonoma County Green Valley AVA. Located at the southwestern corner of the Russian River Valley AVA, its close proximity to the Pacific Ocean makes it one of the coolest appellations within Sonoma County. The climate in the Green Valley is even cooler than other parts of the Russian River Valley, and favors the cultivation of cool climate grape varietals. Seeking to connect the region with the more commercially successful Russian River Valley name, the appellation formally changed its name on April 23, 2007.

Knights Valley 
The Knights Valley AVA occupies the boundaries between the southern end of the Alexander Valley AVA and the northern end of Napa Valley. Some of the earliest vineyards in the area was owned by Beringer Vineyards. The area is known for its Cabernet Sauvignon.

Los Carneros 
The Los Carneros AVA spans the last, low hills of the Mayacamas Mountains dividing both Napa and Sonoma Valleys just north of San Pablo Bay. The larger portion of the AVA stretches into Sonoma County with grapes grown here also being allowed to use the Sonoma Valley AVA designation. The area's close proximity to the Bay has made it an ideal location for Pinot noir and Chardonnay production with producers from international Champagne houses such as Moët et Chandon (Domaine Chandon California), Taittinger (Domaine Carneros), and Cava producers planting vineyards or sourcing grapes from the area.

Moon Mountain District Sonoma County 
The Moon Mountain District Sonoma County AVA, officially approved by the TTB in 2013, is a sub-appellation of the Sonoma Valley AVA. Moon Mountain AVA shares its eastern border with Mt. Veeder AVA, a sub-appellation of Napa Valley.

Northern Sonoma 
The Northern Sonoma AVA is an all encompassing appellation that covers all of Sonoma County with the exception of the Sonoma Valley and some areas of the Petaluma River watershed. The AVA was proposed by E & J Gallo to accommodate wines made from a blend of grapes from scattered vineyards in Sonoma County.

Petaluma Gap 
The Petaluma Gap AVA is the newest wine region of Sonoma County (approved in December 2017) and takes its name from the geographic feature which allows cool ocean air currents to flow into the valley. These winds, combined with the influence of San Pablo Bay, make the region ideal for Pinot Noir, Chardonnay and Syrah.

Pine Mountain-Cloverdale Peak
The Pine_Mountain-Cloverdale Peak AVA is one of the highest elevation grape-growing regions in California. The AVA, which rises from 1,600 feet at its lowest point to 3,000 feet at the mountain’s peak, has grapes growing primarily at 1,800 feet and higher. The very high elevation of the mountain affects fog cover, hours of daylight, daytime and nighttime temperatures, rainfall, and wind — virtually every climatic element influencing wine grape production.

Rockpile 
The Rockpile AVA is situated at the northwest point of the Dry Creek Valley AVA, past Healdsburg. The area was first planted by Italian immigrants at the turn of the 20th century. Many of today's vineyards were formerly occupied by a reservoir created by the Warm Springs Dam on the Russian River. The area is known for its fruity, ripe Zinfandels.

Russian River Valley 

The Russian River Valley AVA lies adjacent to and west of the city of Santa Rosa and incorporates the southern reach of the Russian River, where the river bends westward and cuts through the Coast Range to the Pacific Ocean. The AVA is characterized by the regular intrusion of cooling fog from the coast. The fog flows through the Petaluma Wind Gap and the channel cut by the river. The fog generally arrives in the evening or early morning and retreats before noon in the day. The appellation was granted AVA status in 1983 and accounts for about one-sixth of the total planted vineyard acreage in Sonoma County. Presently the Russian River AVA includes more than  planted to wine grapes. At last count, 79 wineries were listed in the Russian River Valley Winegrowers website. The area is known for its success with cool climate varietals, notably Pinot noir and Chardonnay.

Sonoma Coast 
It extends from San Pablo Bay to the border with Mendocino County. The appellation is known for its cool climate and high rainfall relative to other parts of Sonoma County. Pinot noir grapes grow especially well in this region, where they benefit from slightly cooler day temperatures.

Sonoma Valley 

The Sonoma Valley AVA is known for its unique terroir with Sonoma Mountain protecting the area from the wet and cool influence of the nearby Pacific Ocean. The Sonoma Mountains to the west help protect the valley from excessive rainfall. The cool air that does affect the region comes northward from San Pablo Bay through the Carneros region and southward from the Santa Rosa plain. Sonoma Valley has played a significant role in the history of California wine.

Sonoma Mountain 
The Sonoma Mountain AVA, in the Sonoma Mountains, includes the town of Glen Ellen and is bordered on the west by the Sonoma Valley AVA. The area is known for the diverse micro-climates that occur within the crevices and folds of the hillside terrain and as such is home to production for a wide range of varietals including Cabernet Sauvignon, Chardonnay, Pinot noir, Sauvignon blanc, Semillon, and Zinfandel.

Notable wineries 

B. R. Cohn Winery
Charles Creek Vineyard
Cline Cellars
D'Agostini Winery
De Loach Vineyards
Gloria Ferrer
Kendall-Jackson Winery
Kenwood Vineyards
Kistler Vineyards
Korbel Champagne Cellars
Remick Ridge Vineyards
Viansa Winery & Marketplace

See also 
 Lake County wine
 Mendocino County wine
 Napa County wine
 Wine Country (California)

References

External links 
Sonoma County Winegrape Commission
Sonoma County Vintners
Sonoma Valley Vintners and Growers Alliance

California wine
Economy of Sonoma County
Food and drink in the San Francisco Bay Area